Rodolfo Mijares (17 July 1938 – 2 April 2018) was a Mexican track and field athlete who competed in the decathlon at the 1960 Summer Olympics. He also competed at the 1959 Pan American Games, finishing seventh. He won the athletics pentathlon at the 1959 Central American and Caribbean Games, becoming the second Mexican to do so after Amador Terán.

International competitions

References

External links
 

1938 births
2018 deaths
Sportspeople from Chihuahua (state)
Mexican decathletes
Mexican male athletes
Mexican pentathletes
Olympic decathletes
Olympic athletes of Mexico
Athletes (track and field) at the 1960 Summer Olympics
Pan American Games competitors for Mexico
Athletes (track and field) at the 1959 Pan American Games
Competitors at the 1959 Central American and Caribbean Games
Central American and Caribbean Games gold medalists for Mexico
Central American and Caribbean Games medalists in athletics
People from Delicias, Chihuahua